Tutu Much, stylised as TuTuMUCH, is a 2010 Canadian documentary film that focuses on the 9- to 12-year-old entering class of the Royal Winnipeg Ballet's Summer School Program.

It is produced by Ballet Girls Inc, a co-production between Merit Motion Pictures and Vonnie VON HELMOLT Films. It is directed by Elise Swerhone.

Synopsis
The Royal Winnipeg Ballet's Summer School Program is the first step to beginning a career as a professional ballet dancer. But that doesn't mean that it's easy. 9 young girls come from all over the world to enter the program, knowing that if they don't get in by a certain age, it will be far too late to become a ballerina. A dancer can try her hardest but not make it into the next stage just based on her physical musculature. Those that do make it face a difficult decision - spend their childhood and teen years away from their families and focusing on the daily strains of ballet training, or live as a normal teenager...

References

External links 

Winnipeg Sun review
The Star review
Cineplex synopsis
Hoyts synopsis

2010 films
Documentary films about ballet
Canadian documentary films
Films shot in Winnipeg
Documentary films about children
Royal Winnipeg Ballet
2010 documentary films
Canadian dance films
2010s English-language films
2010s Canadian films